Bedlno  is a village in the administrative district of Gmina Radzyń Podlaski, within Radzyń Podlaski County, Lublin Voivodeship, in eastern Poland.  The village is the seat of the administrative district (gmina) known as Gmina Bedlno.  It has a population of approximately 640.

References

Bedlno